E1, E01, E.I or E-1 may refer to:

Transportation

Aircraft
 Azcárate E-1, a Mexican sesquiplane trainer
 Fokker E.I, a German fighter aircraft
 Grumman E-1 Tracer, an American airborne early warning aircraft
 Hydra Technologies E1 Gavilán, a hand-launched Mexican unmanned electronic surveillance drone
 Junkers E.I, the Idflieg designation for the 1916 Junkers J1 monoplane
 LVG E.I, a 1915 German two-seat monoplane
 NFW E.I, a 1917 German monoplane fighter  
 Pfalz E.I, a Morane-Saulnier H monoplane built under licence for Germany
 Siemens-Schuckert E.I, a 1915 German single seat monoplane
 Standard E-1, a 1917 early American Army fighter aircraft

Automobiles
 BMW E1, a 1991 and 1993 German electric/hybrid city car concept
 BYD e1, a 2019–present Chinese electric city car
 Dongfeng Fengguang E1, a 2019–present Chinese electric mini crossover
 Haima E1, a 2020–present Chinese electric city car
 Roewe, a 2012 Chinese electric city car concept
 E1, a Mazda E type piston engine

Submarines
 HMS E1, an E-class submarine of the Royal Navy
 USS E-1 (SS-24), a 1917 E-class submarine of the United States Navy

Roads
 E01, Southern Expressway in Sri Lanka
 European route E01, from Northern Ireland to Spain
 E1 European long distance path, a long-distance hiking route from Norway to Italy
 London Buses route E1, a transport for London contracted bus route
 Tomei Expressway and Meishin Expressway, route E1 in Japan
 North–South Expressway Northern Route and New Klang Valley Expressway, route E1 in Malaysia
 E1 expressway (Philippines) (North Luzon Expressway, Subic–Clark–Tarlac Expressway, and Tarlac–Pangasinan–La Union Expressway), expressway route in the Philippines
 E1 expressway (Pakistan)

Trains and locomotives
 E1 Series Shinkansen, a Japanese high-speed train
 Bavarian E I, a German steam engines locomotive model
 EMC E1, a diesel locomotive
 LB&SCR E1 class, an 1874 British 0-6-0 steam locomotive
 NCC Class E1, a Northern Counties Committee Irish steam locomotive
 NER Class E1, an 1898 class of small 0-6-0T steam locomotive
 PRR E1, an American PRR 4-4-2 steam locomotive
 SP&S Class E-1, a 1934 steam locomotives class

Science and mathematics

Biochemistry
 E1 (HCV), a viral structural protein found in hepatitis C
 E1, a unimolecular elimination mechanism in organic chemistry
 E1-enzymes, also known as Ubiquitin-activating enzymes, an enzyme which catalyzes the first step in the ubiquitination reaction, which targets a protein for degradation via a proteasome]
 E1 regulatory sequence for the insulin gene
 Estrone, a hormone
 Pyruvate dehydrogenase (E1), the first component enzyme of pyruvate dehydrogenase complex
 Acireductone synthase, an enzyme
 Haplogroup E1 (Y-DNA), a human Y-chromosome DNA haplogroup

Mathematics
 Exponential integral, mathematical function
 the E1 series (number series) of preferred numbers

Medicine
 E1-isoprostane, a type of isoprostane

Businesses and organizations
 E1 Music, an independent record label in the United States
 E1 Corp., a Korean chemical and oil company, member of the LS Group
 Entertainment One, an international media company

Electronics
 Honda E1, a predecessor of the ASIMO humanoid robot
 Olympus E-1, a digital single-lens reflex camera

Places
 E1 (Jerusalem), an area east of Jerusalem in the West Bank
 E1 postcode district, London, England, United Kingdom

Other uses
 E01, ECO code for the closed variation of the Catalan Opening in chess
 E01, the Encase Image File Format
 E-1 (rank), the pay grade for enlisted ranks of Private, Airman Basic, and Seaman Recruit in the United States Military
 E1 grade,  a difficulty level in rock climbing
 E-1 (rocket engine), a liquid propellant rocket engine
 E1 carrier, an E-carrier European telecommunications standard
 E1, an AMD CPU from the Bobcat (microarchitecture) family

See also
 1E (disambiguation)